The 1930 Rice Owls football team was an American football team that represented Rice University as a member of the Southwest Conference (SWC) during the 1930 college football season. In its second season under head coach Jack Meagher, the team compiled an 8–4 record (2–4 against SWC opponents) and was outscored by a total of 135 to 91.

Schedule

References

Rice
Rice Owls football seasons
Rice Owls football